Abbeyfield, formally The Abbeyfield Society, is an English housing charity operating in the United Kingdom. It provides sheltered housing and care homes for elderly people.

Based in St Albans, Hertfordshire, it is a registered charity under English law and a registered housing association.

As of January 2022, the charity is led by chief executive Paul Tennant.

It was founded in 1956 by Richard Carr-Gomm OBE (1922–2008).

The Abbeyfield Society directly owns and manages around 200 houses and 20 care homes. It is also affiliated with independent local Abbeyfield charities who together run a further 250 Abbeyfield Society Houses and 60 care homes across the UK. The Abbeyfield Kent Society is the largest independent Abbeyfield society.

A blue plaque in Gomm Road, Bermondsey, London Borough of Southwark, commemorates Richard Carr-Gomm and Abbeyfield Society.

Humanitarian Sir Nicholas Winton was awarded the MBE for his role with Abbeyfield.

References

External links
 
 Richard Carr-Gomm and Abbeyfield (pdf) 
 

Organizations established in 1956
Housing associations based in England
Organisations based in Hertfordshire
Charities for the elderly based in the United Kingdom
Housing for the elderly in the United Kingdom
1956 establishments in England